Rice Lake is a lake in Barron County, Wisconsin, in the United States.  It is one of several lakes that the Red Cedar River flows through.  The city of Rice Lake, Wisconsin is beside it. Rice Lake is a 859 acre lake located in Barron County. It has a maximum depth of 19 feet.

History
The lake was named from the wild rice which was abundant there.

See also
 List of lakes in Wisconsin

References

Lakes of Wisconsin
Lakes of Barron County, Wisconsin